Sonya Michel is an American historian. She is Professor Emerita at the Department History, University of Maryland. She has also taught at Brandeis University, Brown University, Harvard University, Princeton University, University of Chicago, and the University of Illinois Urbana-Champaign. Michel served as Director of United States Studies at the Woodrow Wilson International Center for Scholars.

Career
Sonya Michel earned her Ph.D. in American civilization from Brown University. Her research interests include care work and old-age security, child care, immigration and civil society, race and gender issues, as well as work-family balance. Sonya Michel was a founding editor of the academic journal Social Politics: International Studies in Gender, State and Society. Reflecting on the wide-ranging influence of Michel's career in 2015, the feminist scholar, Eileen Boris, writes that, "Since the 1970s, Sonya Michel has produced historical studies that enhance public debate. Even as she pioneered a precise use of maternalism, she anticipated the placing of care work at the center of the study of welfare states. Through collaboration and inclusion, by crossing academic and geographic borders, and linking past and present, she has modeled what collective research and social engagement looks like."

Sonya Michel's appearances on C-SPAN have included topics such as "Women and Labor Rights" and "Retirement and Social Security".

Personal life
Sonya Michel is married to Jeffrey Herf who is also an American historian and professor at the University of Maryland.

Selected works
 Civil Society, Public Space and Gender Justice: Historical and Comparative Perspectives, co-edited with Gunilla Budde and Karen Hagemann
 Children's Interests / Mothers' Rights:The Shaping of America's Child Care Policy
 Engendering America: A Documentary History, compiled with Robyn Muncy
 The Jewish Woman in America, with Charlotte Baum and Paula Hyman
 2014, Gender and the Long Postwar: Reconsiderations of the United States and the Two Germanys, co-edited with Karen Hagemann
 2011, Women, Migration, and the Work of Care: The United States in Comparative Perspective
 2002, Child Care Policy at the Crossroads: Gender and Welfare State Restructuring, co-edited
 1993, Mothers of a New World: Maternalist Politics and the Origins of Welfare States
 1987, Behind the Lines: Gender and the Two World Wars''

References

External links
Faculty website

Living people
20th-century American historians
21st-century American historians
American women historians
Brown University alumni
Brandeis University faculty
Brown University faculty
Harvard University faculty
Princeton University faculty
University of Chicago faculty
University of Illinois Urbana-Champaign faculty
University of Maryland, College Park faculty
Year of birth missing (living people)